The 1992–93 Eastern Counties Football League season was the 51st in the history of Eastern Counties Football League a football competition in England.

Premier Division

The Premier Division featured 20 clubs which competed in the division last season, along with two new clubs, promoted from Division One:
Diss Town
Fakenham Town

League table

Division One

Division One featured 16 clubs which competed in the division last season, along with three new clubs:
Clacton Town, relegated from the Premier Division
Stanway Rovers, joined from the Essex and Suffolk Border League
Thetford Town, relegated from the Premier Division

League table

References

External links
 Eastern Counties Football League

1992-93
1992–93 in English football leagues